Adrian Polansky (born c. 1950) was appointed secretary of the Kansas Department of Agriculture by Governor Kathleen Sebelius in February 2003. Polansky served on the Kansas Energy Council, the Governor's Council on Homeland Security and Kansas Task Force on Methamphetamine and Illegal Drugs. Polansky graduated from Kansas State University in 1972 with a Bachelor of Science degree in agronomy.

Polansky was appointed Executive Director of the Kansas Farm Service Agency on July 1, 2009 by the Obama Administration. He served in the same capacity from 1993 to 2001 under the Clinton Administration.

Personal life 
Polansky lives in Manhattan, Kansas with his wife, Kristine, who is an attorney. They married in January 2003. Polansky’s first wife, Joyce, died in 1993 after 18 years of marriage. A son, Adam, is a 2002 graduate of Kansas State University who currently is involved in managing the Belleville, Kansas-based family farm and seed business. Adam’s twin, A.J., was lost in an automobile accident in January 2001. A daughter, Amber, and her husband, are graduates of the University of Kansas pharmacy school. They own and operate City Pharmacy in Minneapolis, Kansas. Benjamin Larscheid, Polansky’s stepson by his current marriage, attends Ft. Hays State University.

Organizations 
 Member, Kansas Crop Improvement Association, 1964–present
 Secretary/Treasurer, National Association of Wheat Growers Education Foundation, 1987
 President, Kansas Crop Improvement Association, 1986–1987
 Agriculture Council of America, 1979–1985
 Former Policy Chairman, Kansas Farmers Union
 Former President, Republic County Farmers Union
 Member, Former Chairman, United States Wheat Associates.

External links 
 Kansas Farm Service Agency
 https://web.archive.org/web/20090528041607/http://www.ksda.gov/
 http://kansas.gov

Living people
1950s births
Kansas Secretaries of Agriculture
United States Department of Agriculture officials
Obama administration personnel
Clinton administration personnel
Kansas Democrats
Farmers from Kansas
Politicians from Manhattan, Kansas
Kansas State University alumni
People from Manhattan, Kansas